Gimme 5 was a boy band in the Philippines who were signed under the Star Music label.

History
In 2013, the band debuted on ASAP 18 where they performed British boy band the Wanted's "Glad You Came". The group admits to not being good singers. Nash even describes his voice as "parang pinunit na maong (like a denim being torn)". Since then, the group improved themselves as singers, dancers and models. Their following on social media had also grown since.

In November 2014, Gimme 5 released their self-titled debut album under Star Music.

They also starred in the TV series Bagito alongside Alexa Ilacad, Ella Cruz and Angel Aquino which ended in March 2015.

The group were interviewed by Myx on how they got their group name which was supposedly named "Baby Boys" which they found "baduy".

After the TV series Bagito, they resumed their album tour which was slowed down due to the TV series. Sold out album tours were held in different places in the Philippines, giving their fans a chance to watch them perform live. The group also shared in an interview with PUSH a memorable fan experience at the Albay Astrodome in Legazpi.

They first won an award in June 2015, as "Most Promising Recording/Performing Group" at the 46th GMMSF Box-Office Entertainment Awards.

On August 14, 2015, the Teen Power: The Kabataan Pinoy Concert Party led by Gimme 5 and joined by the PBB 737 Teen Housemates was held at the Aliw Theater in Pasay.

In September 2015, Gimme 5 won the Clash of Celebrities on Saturday, which was part of the kick-off celebration for the sixth anniversary of It's Showtime held at the Smart Araneta Coliseum.

After a year of touring, their final leg was held in Dagupan on May 7, 2016. After their final leg, they decided to lean on acting as individuals.

In 2017, the group came back to release their Sophomore album under Star Music. Consisting of 5 new tracks, two of those were written by group members; the track "First Love" by Aguas and "Hindi Ko Alam" by Reyes.

Members
The teen male group was composed of five members: Brace Arquiza, Grae Fernandez, Joaquin Reyes, John Bermundo, and Nash Aguas.

Nash Aguas - lead and backing vocals, rhythm guitar, keyboards, lead guitar, bass, dancing

Brace Arquiza - backing and lead vocals, lead guitar, bass, rhythm guitar, keyboards, dancing

John Bermundo - backing and occasional lead vocals, bass, keyboards, dancing

Grae Fernandez - lead and backing vocals, drums, percussion, dancing

Joaquin Reyes - backing and lead vocals, keyboards, organ, bass, rhythm guitar, dancing

Discography

Studio albums
On 6 November 2014, Gimme 5 released their debut album under Star Music.

On 29 April 2017, Gimme 5 released their sophomore album.

Singles

Music videos

Composition credits

Filmography

TV series

TV shows

Concerts

Accolades

References

External links
Gimme 5 on Star Music

Star Magic
Star Music artists
ABS-CBN personalities
Filipino boy bands
Musical groups established in 2013
Musical groups disestablished in 2017
Musical quintets
2013 establishments in the Philippines